Filip Maertens (born 1978) is a Belgian founder with a background in cyber-security and artificial intelligence.
He was founder of Securax (1999), a Belgium-based cyber-security consulting company (acquired), and founder of Argus Labs (2011), an Antwerp-based artificial intelligence company.

As a cyber-security researcher in 1999-2001, Maertens published multiple software vulnerabilities on Microsoft and Linux platforms, and was a global trainer on the Extreme Hacking courses.

As a public speaker, Filip has been on TEDx, Cannes Lions, LeWeb, TheNextWeb, Strata  and more.

Maertens was named Belgium's Top 50 Entrepreneur (2014)  and Innovator (2015).

References

External links
 TEDx Leuven Filip Maertens profile at TEDxLeuven, 2012
 TEDx UHasselt Salon Filip Maertens profile at TEDxUHasselt, 2013

Living people
1978 births
Belgian businesspeople
Flemish businesspeople
21st-century Belgian businesspeople